Hopewell Center or Hopewell Centre may refer to:

 China
 Hopewell Centre (Hong Kong)

 United States
 Hopewell, Seneca County, Ohio, also Hopewell Center
 Hopewell Center, New York
 Hopewell Center, Pennsylvania